The Nieuport 12 (or Nieuport XII in contemporary sources) was a French sesquiplane reconnaissance, fighter aircraft and trainer used by France, Russia, Great Britain and the United States during World War I. Later production examples were built as trainers and served widely until the late 1920s.

Design and development
To improve the performance of the Nieuport 10 a re-engined version was developed as the Nieuport 12 with a significantly enlarged upper wing. A Lewis gun was fitted to the rear cockpit for use by the observer, normally on an Etévé ring (known as the Nieuport ring in British service) although early examples used a pedestal mount or half ring. A second Lewis was sometimes fitted to fire over the top wing. Nieuport 12s built by Beardmore used by the Royal Flying Corps were sometimes fitted with a Scarff ring instead of the Nieuport ring, and a synchronized Vickers gun for the pilot. Additional modifications were made to those built by Beardmore.

It could be fitted with either a  Clerget,  Clerget 9B engine or  Le Rhône 9J mounted in the nose.

Variants

Nieuport 12 A.2
Two-seat fighter-reconnaissance biplane, powered by  Clerget 9Z engine. or  Le Rhône 9J.
Nieuport 12bis C.2
Revised version with  Clerget 9B engine and streamlined side fairings.
Nieuport 13
Two prototypes with increased span but same nominal wing area as 12. One powered by a  Hispano-Suiza 8, and the other by an  Le Rhône 9C.
Nieuport 20
Version powered by  Le Rhône 9J.  Not used by France, but 21 delivered to Royal Flying Corps. All but first examples externally similar to 12bis.
23 meter Nieuport
Unofficial generic designation for all types listed here based on nominal wing area of 23 square meters.
Nieuport 80 E.2 and 81 E.2
Nieuport 12s were later built in large numbers specifically as training aircraft with the gun ring removed. 8 in designation referred to  Le Rhône 9C. These differed in having flight controls for just the pilot in the rear seat (81 E.2), or both pilot and passenger (80 E.2).
Nieuport 12 (Beardmore)
Beardmore progressively redesigned the Nieuport 12 during a production run of 50 aircraft so early examples were almost stock but late production examples differed considerably in detail. These were fitted with  Clerget 9Z and  Clerget 9B rotaries.
Mitsubishi Army Type 甲 1 (Ko 1) Trainer
Japanese designation for licence built Nieuport 81 E.2s. 57 built.
Trainer Type 1
Siamese designation for Nieuport 80 E.2.
Sipowicz 1
Polish experimental aircraft using lifting struts similar to the Wright-Bellanca WB-2.

Operators

Argentine Naval Aviation – One aircraft in 1919

Belgian Air Force

Chilean Air Force – One aircraft only.

Aéronautique Militaire

Estonian Air Force – Postwar.

Royal Hellenic Navy

Imperial Japanese Army Air Service – received 40 Nieuport 81 E.2 from France in 1919, supplemented with 57 licence-built aircraft.

Polish Air Force

Portuguese Air Force

Romanian Air Corps

Imperial Russian Air Service

Serbian Air Force
 Siam
Royal Siamese Aeronautical Service – One aircraft only.

Royal Flying Corps
No. 45 Squadron RFC
No. 46 Squadron RFC
No. 65 Squadron RFC
No. 84 Squadron RFC
Royal Naval Air Service
No. 7 Squadron RNAS
No. 10 Squadron RNAS

American Expeditionary Force

Workers' and Peasants' Air Fleet

Survivor
A single ex-French Nieuport 12 is on display following an extensive restoration (including reinstalling the original Le Rhône 9J rotary engine) at the Canada Aviation and Space Museum in Ottawa in the late 1990s. This aircraft was donated to the Canadian Dominion Archives along with a Canon de 75 modèle 1897 cannon and an extensive collection of propaganda posters by the French Government in 1916 and was used for war bond drives until the 1918 flu pandemic resulted in it being placed in storage. In the late 1960s the Royal Canadian Air Force partially converted it into an RFC Beardmore example for display.

Specifications (French-built Nieuport 12 A.2)

See also

References

Notes

Bibliography

1910s French fighter aircraft
Military aircraft of World War I
 012
1910s French military trainer aircraft
1910s French military reconnaissance aircraft
Sesquiplanes
Single-engined tractor aircraft
Aircraft first flown in 1915
Rotary-engined aircraft